High Schools is a 1984 American documentary film produced and directed by Charles Guggenheim. It is based on Ernest L. Boyer's book, High School, and was filmed on location in seven American high schools. The film was nominated for an Academy Award for Best Documentary Feature.

References

External links

Guggenheim Productions

1984 films
1984 documentary films
1984 short films
American documentary films
Documentary films about high school in the United States
1980s English-language films
1980s American films